Erik Endel Paartalu (born 3 May 1986) is an Australian professional footballer of Estonian descent who plays as a defensive midfielder. He has played professionally in Scotland, Australia, China, Qatar, South Korea, Thailand and India.

Club career

NSL
Paartalu began his career with Northern Spirit in the National Soccer League, after stints with the Spirit youth team and the New South Wales Institute of Sport. His NSL career at the Spirit was however limited to a single appearance as a substitute on 11 January 2004 against the Melbourne Knights.

After the dissolution of the Northern Spirit, Paartalu moved to the Northern Tigers in the New South Wales Winter Super League where he played 17 matches scoring four goals in the 2004 season.

During 2004 Paartalu moved to the Parramatta Eagles who were then playing in the National Premier Leagues NSW. He continued with the Eagles until the latter half of the 2006 season, before he decided to take his chances on a career in the United Kingdom.

Scotland

After a trial with Doncaster in League One it was expected he would sign a contract until the departure of manager Dave Penney put an end to the deal.
Arriving at Gretna in September Paartalu was signed on a short-term contract after a trial. A number of impressive performances led to a two and a half-year contract being signed in January 2007. Paartalu joined Stirling Albion on 1 January 2008 on a loan deal from Gretna until the end of the 2007/2008 season. Paartalu made his debut for the Binos against Hamilton on 5 January 2008 at New Douglas Park. In his second game he scored his first and only goal for the club, in a 4–1 defeat to Livingston.

Paartalu was released by Gretna in March 2008 due to them entering administration. He then joined Greenock Morton. After helping Morton stay in the First Division, Paartalu signed a two-year deal at the end of April 2008 to keep him at Cappielow until 2010.

Brisbane Roar

With his contract at Morton running out in the summer, Paartalu signed a pre-contract agreement with Brisbane Roar on 24 February 2010. Paartalu became an important player for Brisbane, a linchpin in the midfield and scoring crucial goals. Paartalu's defining moment at the Roar came in the 2011 A-League Grand Final, where he scored the equaliser with the last touch of the game in the 120th minute. He also went on to score the Roar's second penalty in the shootout against the Mariners.  Paartalu was awarded the A-League Solo Goal of the Year for the 2010–11 season for his volley against Gold Coast United in the last game of the regular season.

In Brisbane's first match of the 2011–12 finals series, Paartalu's powerful strike sealed a 2–0 win for Brisbane in the first leg against the Central Coast.

Paartalu started in 85 consecutive games for Brisbane Roar in the A-League and the AFC Champions League in both the 2010–11 and 2011–12 seasons, including the A-League finals series.

Tianjin Teda
On 21 January 2013 it was confirmed that Paartalu had signed a three-year deal with Tianjin Teda in the Chinese Super League.

Muangthong United
After leaving Tianjin Teda in February 2014, Paartalu signed for Muangthong United in the Thai Premier League.

Melbourne City
In July 2014, Paartalu was offered a to be signed as a domestic marquee player by Newcastle Jets, but he opted to see out his contract with Muangthong United. In September Newcastle Jets reopened talks with Paartalu, following the departure of Craig Goodwin from the club. However, despite the courting and lucrative offer by Newcastle Jets, on 15 September Paartalu signed a four-year deal with Melbourne City under the salary cap, saying "I want to be at a club with an ambition to be successful on and off the field and Melbourne City FC is that club." After 40 games and 7 goals for the club across nearly two season, Paartalu was released by the club to pursue opportunities in South Korea.

Jeonbuk Hyundai Motors
Following his release from Melbourne City, Paartalu joined K League Classic side Jeonbuk Hyundai Motors on a one-year deal. However, after just three months with the team, Paartalu was dropped from the squad, with coach Chio Kang-hee asking the midfielder to train alone.

Al Kharaitiyat
In October 2016, Paartalu joined Qatari Stars League club Al Kharaitiyat.

Bengaluru FC
On 5 July 2017, Paartalu joined Indian Super League club Bengaluru FC on a one-year deal. In November, he scored a brace against Delhi Dynamos. On 14 March 2018, his contract was extended until the end of 2020. Paartalu was part of the 2018–19 Indian Super League season winning squad and ended the following 2019–20 season as the club's highest assist getter with five contributions to his name. Paartalu signed a two-year extension to his contract with Bengaluru FC at the end of the 2019-20 campaign. "Bengaluru has held a special place in my heart for the past three years. Every time I leave the city, I am somehow drawn back to it," Paartalu said after putting pen to paper. In September 2021, Bengaluru FC announced that Paartalu and the club had parted ways.

International career
Paartalu represented Australia at the 2003 FIFA U-17 World Championship. Paartalu played in all three of Australia's three games in the tournament, including losses against Argentina and Nigeria. On 21 February 2012 he was selected to play for the "Socceroos" against Saudi Arabia national football team in a World Cup qualification match. Paartalu also represented the Australian National Team in two games at the 2013 EAFF East Asian Cup, with appearances against South Korea and China PR.

Career statistics

Club

Honours

Club 
Gretna
 Scottish Football League First Division: 2006–07

Brisbane Roar
 A-League Championship: 2010–11, 2011–12
 A-League Premiership: 2010–11

Jeonbuk Hyundai Motars
 AFC Champions League: Winner 2016
Bengaluru
 Indian Super League : 2017-18 (Table Toppers)
Indian Super League: 2018–19 (Table Toppers + Cup)
 Super Cup: 2018

International 
Australia U-17
 OFC U-17 Championship: 2003

Individual 
 A-League Goal of the Year: 2010–11

References

External links
Indian Super League Profile

OzFootball profile

1986 births
Living people
Soccer players from Sydney
Association football midfielders
Australian expatriate soccer players
Australian expatriate sportspeople in Scotland
Expatriate footballers in Scotland
Expatriate footballers in China
Scottish Premier League players
National Soccer League (Australia) players
A-League Men players
Chinese Super League players
Brisbane Roar FC players
Greenock Morton F.C. players
Gretna F.C. players
Northern Spirit FC players
Stirling Albion F.C. players
Tianjin Jinmen Tiger F.C. players
Erik Paartalu
Melbourne City FC players
Jeonbuk Hyundai Motors players
Al Kharaitiyat SC players
Scottish Football League players
Australian people of Estonian descent
Parramatta FC players
Expatriate footballers in Thailand
K League 1 players
Bengaluru FC players
Qatar Stars League players
Australian expatriate sportspeople in Thailand
Australian expatriate sportspeople in China
Australian expatriate sportspeople in India
Australian soccer players
Australia international soccer players
Expatriate footballers in India